Andrew Murdison (16 May 1898 – 1968) was a Scottish rugby union and professional rugby league footballer who played in the 1920s. He played representative level rugby union (RU) for Scottish Borders, and at club level for Galashiels RFC (captain), as a centre, i.e. number 12 or 13, and representative level rugby league (RL) for Other Nationalities, and at club level for Halifax (Heritage № 299).

Early life and family
Murdison was born in Lauder, Scottish Borders, to Robert Hope Murdison, a plumber, and Elizabeth Copeland Forbes. His family was active in rugby union. His father and an uncle, Thomas B. Murdison, both played for Galashiels RFC in the 1890s. Tom Murdison was permanently suspended for a notorious incident at Mossilee. In later life, Andrew Murdison joined his father's plumbing business in Earlston.

International honours
Andrew Murdison won cap(s) for Other Nationalities (RL) while at Halifax.

Contemporaneous article extract
"A. Murdison. Halifax (Northern Rugby league.) "A. Murdison is one of the club's finest discoveries. Born in Lowden (sic), he became connected with the Galashiels Rugby Union club, and quickly won distinction as a centre three-quarter with wonderful anticipation, and before turning professional, represented his county, besides being captain of his side. He possesses great speed, and is a strong straight runner. He played in the trial games for the last Australian tour in 1924, and only just missed securing a place."

References

External links
Search for "Murdison" at espn.co.uk

1898 births
1969 deaths
Gala RFC players
Halifax R.L.F.C. players
Other Nationalities rugby league team players
People from Galashiels
People from Lauder
Rugby league players from Scottish Borders
Rugby union players from Scottish Borders
Scottish rugby league players
Scottish rugby union players